The ATP Athens Open is a defunct Grand Prix and ATP Tour affiliated tennis tournament held annually in Athens in Greece from 1986 to 1994, played on outdoor clay courts at Athens Lawn Tennis Club. In 2008 the tournament was renewed under the new name of the Status Athens Open on the ATP Challenger Series, awarding $75,000 in prize money.

Finals

Singles

Doubles

See also
 Athens Trophy – women's tournament

References
 ATP Results Archive

 
Athens
Annual sports competitions in Athens
Grand Prix tennis circuit
Clay court tennis tournaments
Tennis tournaments in Greece
Defunct tennis tournaments in Greece
Defunct sports competitions in Greece